Giovanni Antonio Medrano (11 December, 1703–1760)  was a Sicilian born in Sciacca (rather than in Palermo). While still a teenager, he moved with his family to Spain, where he embarked on a military career within the royal corps of engineers created in 1711 by King Philip V of Bourbon. Sebastian had entered the service of Spain in 1719 as a Military Architect, although it is probable that he had already joined the army of the Marquis of Verboom Jorge Próspero de Verboom (one of the best students enrolled in Don Sebastian Fernandez de Medrano's Royal Military Academy of Brussels 1675 -1705), in the Sicilian campaign of 1718, since in December of that same year he appeared as extraordinary engineer and sub-lieutenant of this body, and in 1720 he worked in the Principality of Catalonia. He reappears in 1729, when Medrano was commissioned to organize the roads for the journey of the royal family, headed by Philip V and Isabel de Farnese, from Madrid to Seville. He became a brigadier in the army of Charles of Bourbon, while he was king of the Two Sicilies. Following the Battle of Bitonto in 1734, Charles had Medrano construct a commemorative obelisk in Bitonto. Medrano’s career is particularly studied, from his stay in Seville as a teacher for the royal princes, and his influence on Prince Charles’ architectural taste, to his projects in the kingdom of Naples or the royal palace at Capodimonte.

Education of Charles III, Designing the San Carlo Opera House and Rise in Ranks 
During this Andalusian period, Medrano began to deal with the military and architectural education of the Infante Don Carlos and his brothers; of these tasks, for "instruction and amusement of the Most Serene Prince our Lord and Lords Infantes", there are two plans of a Fort, erected between 1729 and 1730 in Buenavista, on the outskirts of Seville, which included a ravelin dedicated to the Infante don Carlos himself. 

In 1731 he left Seville to accompany the Infante don Carlos, Duke of Parma and Piacenza, on his trip to Italy. From 1732 to 1734 he remained in the service of the Infante, teaching him geography, history and mathematics, as well as military engineering and architecture during his stay in the cities of Florence, Parma and Piacenza.  The fact that he was promoted in 1733 to lieutenant and ordinary engineer and, later and already in Naples, in 1737, to brigadier and chief engineer, testifies to his efforts and work. 

Medrano also appears as "Major Regius Praefectus Mathematicis Regni Neapolitani"(Major Royal Governor of Mathematics of the Kingdom of Naples) even apparently a year before he was named chief engineer of the kingdom, a title he did not receive until 1735.  In 1737, Charles commissioned Medrano to design the new San Carlo opera house in Naples.

The Palace of Capodimonte 
 Medrano then went on to design the Museo di Capodimonte, Charles's new palace and museum in Naples. Medrano started work on this in 1738, but the building was not finally completed until 1840. However, still in 1738, with the engineer from Zaragoza Roque Joaquín de Alcubierre, Medrano began the excavations of Herculaneum, giving rise to a new type of activity. 

Also, on the occasion of the festivities for the marriage of Carlos with Maria Amalia of Saxony, Princess of Poland, that same year a cuccagna was erected on the Chiaia riverside, in front of the church of San Leonardo, allestita by Medrano, who perhaps also project the pavilion, in the form of an old castle on a palafitte, with four corner towers and a central one, bastions, moats, battlements, embrasures and sentry boxes, as well as two rebellines with parapets and new sentry boxes. 

It is possible that shortly after he resumed his work as a military engineer, since in 1746 he signed a plan of the plaza and bay of Gibraltar, where he would have moved for effect, but to return to Naples, where he was in 1751, projecting the Terrasanta of the church of the Santissima Trinità dei Pellegrini (Santa Maria di Materdomini), whose environment has recalled solutions with a Vanvitellian flavor and testifies to a single relative eclipse of his Neapolitan fortune. After that date, his name seems to have disappeared completely.

References

External links

1703 births
1760 deaths
People from Sciacca
18th-century Italian architects
Architects from Sicily